Theatre Royal, Plymouth, is a theatre venue in Plymouth, Devon. It consists of a 1,300-seat main auditorium, The Lyric, which regularly hosts large-scale musicals, opera and ballet; a 200-seat studio, The Drum; and a 50-seat studio, The Lab. On a separate site, Theatre Royal Plymouth also has a production and learning centre, TR2, featuring rehearsal studios and workshops for the production of set and costumes.

The theatre is a National Portfolio Organisation, receiving regular funding from Arts Council England.

A £7 million Regeneration Project was completed in September 2013 with a renovated front of house area and community performance space called The Lab.

A  bronze sculpture depicting a crouching female actor called Messenger was unveiled in front of the theatre, in 2019.

History
In 1758 a theatre was built at the top of George Street in Plymouth. Originally known as the Theatre, Frankfort-Gate, it adopted the name Theatre Royal after King George III and his family visited it in 1789.

In 1810 Plymouth Corporation held a competition for the design of a new theatre, hotel and assembly rooms at the bottom of George Street. The competition was won by John Foulston, who built a neo-classical block of buildings between 1811 and 1813. The new Theatre Royal opened in 1813 and could seat 1,192. Foulston's buildings formed a frontage of  facing George's Place that was dominated by a portico with -high ionic columns. The theatre was on the west side of this portico, with the hotel and assembly rooms on the east. Foulston used thick walls to separate the auditorium from the foyer, corridors and the hotel next door to minimise the risk of fire damage. The whole inner structure was built of cast iron for the same purpose, and Foulston believed it was the only fireproof theatre in the country. Despite these precautions, the theatre suffered a disastrous interior fire in June 1878; by January 1879 it had been repaired and reopened.

The decline in theatre-going caused by the rise in cinema attendance resulted in the building being demolished in 1937. It was replaced by the 2,400-seat Royal Cinema, which opened the following year. The cinema survived the Plymouth Blitz during the Second World War, which destroyed the adjoining hotel and assembly rooms. By 1954 the decline in cinema-going caused by the rise of television led to the cinema's being partly converted back to a theatre and rechristened as the Theatre Royal Cinema. In 1958 it was renamed the ABC Plymouth. It was converted to a triple-screen ABC which opened on 5 May 1977. ABC Cinemas passed to the Cannon Group, then to MGM from 22 May 1992. A management buy-out brought the name ABC back again in the mid-1990s. From 1 August 2006 it was operated by the independent Reel Cinemas chain. The Reel Plymouth Cinema finally closed its doors on Thursday 28 February 2019.

On a different site, the current Theatre Royal was designed in 1977 by the Peter Moro Partnership, which had already designed a number of new theatres around the country. Building started in 1979 and the theatre was officially opened on 5 May 1982 by Princess Margaret.

The Lyric (the main auditorium)
The Lyric seats 1,315 but has a unique ability to compress the auditorium, creating a more intimate performance space of 787. It has a steep auditorium with two galleries and very large proscenium arch. The range of work presented and produced is extensive and includes major touring drama and musical productions, as well as leading opera and dance companies (including the Birmingham Royal Ballet, the Rambert Dance Company, Glyndebourne on Tour and the Welsh National Opera).

In 2019, The SpongeBob Musical was filmed for television in front of a live audience at the Theatre Royal Plymouth.

The Lyric also produces its own drama and musical productions each year, usually with commercial or subsidised partners.

The Drum

The Drum (capacity – 200) specialises in the production of new plays and has a good reputation for its innovative programme. It won the Peter Brook Empty Space Award in 2007. It often collaborates with other subsidised companies and venues such as the Royal Court, ATC, the Lyric Hammersmith, the Bush Theatre, Frantic Assembly, Hampstead Theatre, Paines Plough, the Traverse Theatre and the Tron Glasgow.

The Production and Learning Centre, TR2
The Production and Learning Centre, TR2, is on the bank of the River Plym, and was designed by Ian Ritchie Architects. It contains set, costume, prop-making and rehearsal facilities.  TR2 provides one of the biggest education and outreach programmes for a regional venue in the UK.

References

External links

 Official Website

Theatres in Devon
Buildings and structures in Plymouth, Devon
Theatres in England
Theatres completed in 1982
1982 establishments in England